Wine Country Broadcasting Company is a small San Francisco, California, United States, based radio broadcasting company that owns a translator in Calistoga and a repeater in Cordelia, California.

Wine Country Broadcasting, a California corporation, is owned by the Roger O. Walther SP Trust, and administered by the Tusker Corporation of San Francisco (a Delaware corporation). The trust is administered by Roger O. Walther and Anne Newton Walther, husband and wife. Roger O. Walther is the Chairman and CEO of Tusker.

Wine Country Broadcasting bought the properties, along with KVON and KVYN, in 2003 from Charles B. Moss III, and CBM Napa LLC.

Translators and boosters
 K278AH - 103.5 MHz - translator - Calistoga, California
 KVYN-FM1 - 99.3 MHz - booster -  Cordelia, California

References

External links
 Tusker Corporation

Radio broadcasting companies of the United States
Companies based in San Francisco